Marianna Fontana (born 24 April 1997) is an Italian actress and singer. She starred with her twin sister Angela in Indivisible and had the lead role in Capri-Revolution. She played Ilia in the epic TV-series Romulus.

Discography

Singles

Filmography

Films

Television

References

External links
 

1997 births
Living people
Italian film actresses